Michael McGirl is an American politician serving in the Missouri House of Representatives from Missouri's 118th district. He won the seat after defeating Democrat Barbara Marco 65.6% to 34.4%, thus flipping the district from Democratic to Republican. He had previously run against his predecessor Ben Harris in 2014.

Electoral History

References

Republican Party members of the Missouri House of Representatives
21st-century American politicians
Living people
Year of birth missing (living people)